The men's freestyle heavyweight was a freestyle wrestling event held as part of the Wrestling at the 1924 Summer Olympics programme. It was the fourth appearance of the event. Heavyweight was the heaviest category, including wrestlers weighing over 87 kilograms.

Results
Source: Official results; Wudarski

Gold medal round

Silver medal round

Bronze medal round
As Nilsson, Richthoff, and Dame declined to compete, Archie MacDonald was awarded the bronze medal.

References

Wrestling at the 1924 Summer Olympics